Yes sir may refer to:
 "Yes Sir, That's My Baby" (song), a 1925 originally English-language song by Gus Kahn and Walter Donaldson
 Yes Sir That's My Baby (film), a 1949 film
 Yessir, That's My Baby (album), a 1978 Count Basie and Oscar Peterson album
 "So bin ich und so bleibe ich, Yes Sir!", an originally German-language song by Ralph Benatzky famously performed by Zarah Leander
 "Yes Sir, I Can Boogie", a 1977 originally English-language song by Frank Dostal and Rolf Soja
 "Yes Sir" (Capone-N-Noreaga song), a 2003 Capone-N-Noreaga song